Nur Tatar Askari (born August 16, 1992 in Van, Turkey) is a world and European champion Turkish female taekwondo practitioner competing in the feather, light and welterweight divisions. She is of Kurdish descent.

She was a member of the TSE Sports Club in Ankara before she transferred to Ankara İller Bankası. She is coached by Cüneyt Gülçek.

Nur Tatar won her first medal at the age of 15. She won twice the European Junior Taekwondo Championships, and reached to gold medals in A-class tournaments in Europe. She won the silver medal at the 2010 European Taekwondo Championships held in Saint Petersburg, Russia.

She qualified for the 2012 Summer Olympics where she won the silver medal at 67 kg. At the 2013 Mediterranean Games in Mersin, Turkey she became gold medalist. She qualified again for olympics at 2016

She got married in 2017 to a former member of Iranian national taekwondo team Mehran Askari.

Tournament record

References

External links

1992 births
Sportspeople from Van, Turkey
Turkish female taekwondo practitioners
Living people
Turkish female martial artists
Olympic taekwondo practitioners of Turkey
Taekwondo practitioners at the 2012 Summer Olympics
Olympic silver medalists for Turkey
Olympic medalists in taekwondo
Medalists at the 2012 Summer Olympics
Turkish sportspeople
European Games bronze medalists for Turkey
European Games medalists in taekwondo
Taekwondo practitioners at the 2015 European Games
Taekwondo practitioners at the 2016 Summer Olympics
Olympic bronze medalists for Turkey
Mediterranean Games gold medalists for Turkey
Competitors at the 2013 Mediterranean Games
Universiade medalists in taekwondo
Mediterranean Games medalists in taekwondo
Universiade bronze medalists for Turkey
European Taekwondo Championships medalists
World Taekwondo Championships medalists
Medalists at the 2015 Summer Universiade
Taekwondo practitioners at the 2020 Summer Olympics
21st-century Turkish women